Suleh (also Romanized as Sūleh and Sooleh; also known as Sallāh) is a village in Shivanat Rural District, Afshar District, Khodabandeh County, Zanjan Province, Iran. At the 2006 census, its population was 514, in 109 families.

References 

Populated places in Khodabandeh County